Marcus Cocceius Nerva (before 5 BC – AD 33) was a member of the entourage of the Roman emperor Tiberius and a celebrated jurist. He was the son of Marcus Cocceius Nerva and the grandfather of emperor Nerva.

In AD 24 Tiberius appointed him to the head of the curatores aquarum, a three-man commission responsible for Rome's water supply. In 33 he starved himself to death despite the pleas of Tiberius. In explanation Tacitus writes: "Those who knew his thoughts said that as he saw more closely into the miseries of the State, he chose, in anger and alarm, an honourable death, while he was yet safe and unassailed on." From this we may infer that he despaired at the tyrannies of the Praetorian Guard and committed suicide as a form of protest and may have been worried about his own safety.

In popular culture
He was portrayed in the film Caligula by Sir John Gielgud.

See also
Cocceia gens

References

1st-century BC births
33 deaths
1st-century BC Romans
1st-century Romans
Ancient Romans who committed suicide
Nerva, Marcus
Suicides by starvation